The Chicago Times-Herald race was the first automobile race held in the United States. Sponsored by the Chicago Times-Herald, the race was held in Chicago in 1895 among six motorized vehicles: four cars and two motorcycles. It was won by Frank Duryea's Motorized Wagon. The race created considerable publicity for the motocycle, which had been introduced in the United States only two years earlier.

Race
On July 10, 1895, the Chicago Times-Herald announced a race to be held in the city, prizes totaling $5,000 (approximately $ in ). The promotion was an attempt to foster growth of the young auto industry in the United States and to boost newspaper sales. The first automobiles in the nation were produced only two years earlier, and they were so new at the time that the paper's editors could not easily agree upon a name for them. After considerable wrangling, the editors decided to call it a Moto Cycle race, and first used the term in a July 15 article.

The original course of the race was to run from Chicago north to Milwaukee, but the roads were found to be too poor for early cars to easily traverse. The route was changed to be only  from Chicago to Evanston and back. The finish line was near what is now the Chicago Museum of Science and Industry (what had been the Palace of Fine Arts at the 1893 Columbian Exposition).  The race was intended to be held on November 2, but few cars had shown up, and the race was rescheduled. Eighty-three cars were initially entered into the race, but only six arrived for the actual competition. Many of the entrants did not have their cars completed on time, and several were unable to make the journey. Elwood Haynes' car, which was a favorite to win the race, was damaged en route and unable to compete.

Both Haynes and the driver of a Benz car were stopped by police while driving their cars into the city. They were forced to requisition horses to pull the cars because, as the police informed them, they had no right to drive their vehicles on the city streets. The situation caused the race to again be postponed while the Chicago Times-Herald editors convinced the city leaders to pass an ordinance to confirm the right of these vehicles to travel on city streets. Once the ordinance passed, the race was held on November 28, Thanksgiving Day. The day was snowy and 38 °F (4 °C), the roads muddy, with snow drifts in places.

The first car to arrive at the starting line was a German-made car by inventor Karl Benz. In total, three Benz cars ran in the race. The only other four-wheeled car to run in the race was Frank Duryea's motorized wagon. The two other vehicles that took part were two-wheeled automobiles. The "motorcycles" lacked the power to climb one of the course's grades. Another entrant was electric-powered, and its battery died because of the cold weather before getting very far. Just after starting, one Benz struck a horse, and was forced to leave the race. On the return trip from Evanston the Duryea began to take the lead.

The Benz entered by Oscar B. Mueller crossed the finish line an hour and a half later. From point 31  of the course to the finish Mueller's car was driven by Charles Brady King because Mueller went unconscious from exposure. King was originally an umpire to the race and of this motorcycle. None of the other vehicles finished.

The race was the first known automobile race in the United States. Newspapers across the country carried stories about the race and many predicted the coming demise of horse-borne transportation, citing the cars' ability to travel even in poor weather. The success of the race sped up the rate of automobile development by at least five years in the United States due to the publicity of the event. The commercial production of American automobiles began only a year later.

The contest rules published prior to the race stated the following prizes were available. 

Post-race prizes
The Fort Worth Gazette stated, "The prizes will be awarded on the showing made in the road race, and in the scientific tests which have been made under the supervision of the best experts in the country."  But it was not until December 5, 1895 that the official prize results were announced.  The race judges determined that, "All contestants violated the rules of the race.  None of the three contestants which finished at Jackson Park kept the course."

"The judges were compelled to make their awards based on the showing in the tests and in the road race.  The test took precedence in the rules, but the remarkable run made by Duryea and Mueller compelled substantial recognition.  It was deemed fair to make an award of the gold medal based largely on tests, and it therefore, went to Morris-Salom.  The other awards were made on road performances and on special points in design."  Total prize money awarded was $5,000.

Epilogue

The Smithsonian Institution states the following regarding the winning Duryea car. "This car was unfortunately destroyed through a workman's misunderstanding many years ago."  The second-place car of Hieronymus Mueller is on display in the Mueller Museum in Decatur, Illinois.

In addition to the enormous amount of publicity the race generated, several other automotive developments were related to this race.
 Motocycle. The early term for the automobile, "motocycle", was born out of a pre-race contest sponsored by the Chicago Times-Herald newspaper to replace the term "horseless carriage" with something better.  The term was never very popular, and it has largely fallen into disuse.  The Indian Motocycle Manufacturing Company used this term consistently to describe its motorcycles from their earliest days until 1953.
 First automotive club.  Charles King, one of the drivers that was to have taken part in the November 2, 1895, contest, sent out letters on October 8, 1895, proposing an automobile club be formed. This led to the creation of the American Motor League on November 1, 1895, in Chicago on the eve of what became the exhibition run between Mueller and Duryea motocycles.  Charles Duryea was elected president on November 29, 1895, at the second meeting.
 First U.S. automotive trade publication. Edward E. Goff in Chicago, almost certainly inspired by the Chicago Times-Herald Race, began publishing the first English language automobile magazine Motocycle in October 1895. This was one month prior to the well known publication Horseless Age which claimed to be the first such publication.
 Selden patent. The Morris & Salom Electrobat was the beginnings of the Electric Vehicle Company of Philadelphia. This firm, although no longer producing automobiles by 1899, acquired the legal rights to the Selden patent, and began the process of trying to collect licensing fees from all U.S. automobile manufacturers.

See also

 Motorsport before 1906

References

External links

 
 

Auto races in the United States
Defunct auto racing series
Sports competitions in Chicago
History of Chicago
Motorsport in Illinois
1895 in American sports
1895 in motorsport
November 1895 sports events
Duryea